Alberta Provincial Highway No. 61, commonly referred to as Highway 61, is an east–west highway in southern Alberta, Canada. In the west, Highway 61 starts at Highway 4 north of the Village of Stirling and ends at Highway 889 east of the Hamlet of Manyberries. It is part of the Red Coat Trail, a historical route north of the Canada–US border. The Red Coat Trail continues to Saskatchewan via Highway 889 and Highway 501.

History
In 1959, Alberta announced $100,000 of improvements to the highway, and incorporation of it to the provincial highway system the following year. Paving was completed by 1961.

Major intersections 
From west to east:

References 

061
County of Forty Mile No. 8
County of Warner No. 5